Grahame Skinner ("Skin") is a Scottish musician who currently fronts the band, The Skinner Group. He has been the lead singer for a number of bands.

He has been a member of:

 The Jazzateers (1983)
 The White Savages / Kites (1983)
 Hipsway (1984–1989, 2016 reunion)
 Witness (1991)
 The Pleasurelords / Sponge (1991)
 Cowboy Mouth (1994–1996)
 Bruise (2004)
 The Skinner Group (formerly Skinner, 2011–present)

He currently fronts The Skinner Group, a collective of Glasgow musicians. The other members are:

 Douglas MacIntyre (guitar)
 Gordon Wilson (drums)
 Campbell Owens (bass)
 Andy Alston (keyboards)

References

External links
 Grahameskinner.com

Scottish songwriters
21st-century Scottish male singers
Musicians from Glasgow
Living people
1962 births
20th-century Scottish male singers
British male songwriters